The Catalan Institute for Water Research - ICRA is a research institute studying  the   water cycle, hydraulic resources, water quality and treatment and evaluation technologies, which is located at the Parc Cientific i Tecnologic de la Universitat de Girona, Girona, Spain. ICRA was created in 2006 by the Government of Catalonia and the University of Girona. 
The research carried out at the ICRA has to do with all the aspects related with water, particularly those associated with its rational use and the effects of human activity on hydraulic resources.
The  Institute is particularly interested in investigating and solving the impacts of drought, along with the aspects of quality in the treatment and reuse of water, dedicating priority attention to the Mediterranean Sea.

Research Areas

Resources and Ecosystems 

This research area investigates the spatial and temporal dynamics of water resources and its potential effects, especially on the structure and function of continental aquatic ecosystems.

Special emphasis is given to irregularities in water resources and the effects of land use and climate change on resources and ecosystems, particularly in the Mediterranean area.

Water Quality 

This area of research seeks to provide a complete and efficient response to the problems and challenges related to water quality, particularly in the Mediterranean area. The assessment of water quality as it is defined in this area—considering chemical, microbiological, and ecotoxicological
quality—allows identification of the tools needed for the adequate management and preservation of water bodies.

The main objective of this area is to define the concentrations, fate and mechanisms of action of pollutants and pathogenic elements in natural and reused waters.

The most modern chemical, microbiological, and ecotoxicological analytical methods are being implemented to assess water quality and to examine the corresponding characteristics of surface waters, groundwaters, and treated water, the latter including both drinking and wastewater. Risk assessment of water pollutants is determined by analyzing the environmental impact of organic compounds in water bodies. Studies of the presence, diversity, and activity of microbes in the aquatic environment are another objective in this area

Technologies and Evaluation 

This research area develops and evaluates methodologies and technologies for optimizing resources, energy efficiency, and cost minimization of processes related to the urban water system.

These objectives are achieved through the application of emerging, resource-optimization technologies of water supply, wastewater treatment, reclamation, and reuse. This area has an integral perspective of the integrated processes involved, from the river to human consumption and back to the system. The development of technologies is related to those best available but not entailing an excessive cost, while striving to achieve resource consumption reduction and optimization, related to water scarcity and improvement of the final product.

References

External links 
ICRA Website

Research institutes in Catalonia
Girona
Organizations established in 2006